Milan Senić (born 11 July 1997) is a Serbian football forward, who plays for SC Düsseldorf-West in the Oberliga Niederrhein.

Born in Szeged, as a member of a Serbian ethnic group, Senić holds both Hungarian and Serbian citizenship.

Club career

Early years
Senić started playing football with local football school Tisza Volán. Coming to German side, Senić played with TuS Koblenz before he joined Bayer Leverkusen youth sistem. Passing throw the club academy, Senić also played in the UEFA Youth League in 2014 and 2015. Next he overgrown youth categories, Senić was loaned to TSG Neustrelitz for a half-season in 2016. After he refused to extend the contract with Bayer Leverkusen, Senić left the club as a free agent.

Red Star Belgrade
On 9 January 2017, Senić signed four-and-a-half-year deal with Red Star Belgrade, when general director of the club, Zvezdan Terzić, compared him with Cristiano Ronaldo. After he spent the winter break off-season with the club, he was loaned to the Serbian First League OFK Beograd on dual registration until the end of season, also playing with Red Star reserves. In summer 2017, Senić moved on loan to Hungarian side BFC Siófok.

International career
After he was a member of Serbia U18 level from 2014 to 2015, Senić was also called into the Serbia national under-19 football team between 2015 and 2016. Playing with the team, Senić made 13 appearances and scored 3 goals in matches against Montenegro, Armenia and Spain.

Career statistics

Club

References

External links
 
 
 
 
 

1997 births
Living people
Sportspeople from Szeged
Association football forwards
Serbian footballers
Serbian expatriate footballers
Expatriate footballers in Germany
Serbian expatriate sportspeople in Germany
Regionalliga players
Serbian First League players
Bayer 04 Leverkusen
TSG Neustrelitz players
Red Star Belgrade footballers
OFK Beograd players
BFC Siófok players
1. FC Lokomotive Leipzig players